Montpellier Hérault Rugby is a French professional rugby union club, based in Montpellier, Occitanie and named after the Hérault river. The club competes in the top level of the French league system, the Top 14. They originally played at Stade Sabathé (capacity 5,000) but moved to the Stade Yves-du-Manoir, later known as Altrad Stadium, and since renamed the GGL Stadium, in 2007. They wear white and blue.

History
The club was established in 1986 through the merger of two other rugby union clubs, the Stade Montpelliérain and MUC Rugby.

In 1993 the club won the Challenge de l'Espérance.

In 2003 the club became the champion of France's second division national rugby league, the Pro D2.  After finishing second in the league table at the end of the 2002–03 season, Montpellier advanced to the playoffs. They defeated Auch in the semi-finals and Tarbes in the finals to win promotion to the Top 14. The following season the club played for the European Shield, and contested the final. Played in May 2004, Montpellier defeated Italian club Viadana 25 points to 19 to win the Shield.

The club barely avoided relegation after the 2006–07 season. Winning only nine games during a twenty-six-game season, Montpellier found itself in a relegation position with only two games left to play.  Thanks to a bonus-point victory in week 25, the team finished just four points ahead of Agen which was relegated to the Pro D2 at the end of the year.

After 2006–07, the club's fortunes began to improve. In June 2007, Fulgence Ouedraogo became the first Montpellier player to play on the French national rugby union team. That same summer the club's new stadium, the Stade Yves-du-Manoir (now GGL Stadium), opened. In 2007–08 Montpellier enjoyed its first winning season in the Top 14. The club made its next step up the table in 2010–11 when it unexpectedly finished sixth by a single point and made the Top 14 playoffs for the first time. The underdog squad defeated both Castres and Racing Métro to make the championship game where they were defeated 15–10 by Toulouse. Since that season, Montpellier has become a consistent playoff contender, finishing fifth in both 2011–12 and 2012–13 and second on the league table in 2013–14.

Thanks to the club's excellent 2010–11 showing, Montpellier was awarded its first spot in the Heineken Cup tournament for 2011–12. The club returned for the 2012–13 tournament and made the quarter-finals before being eliminated by Clermont. Montpellier returned for the final edition of the Heineken Cup in 2013–14, and are participating in the successor to the Heineken Cup, the European Rugby Champions Cup, in 2014–15.

From 2011 the club has been chaired and funded by Mohed Altrad.

In late November 2019, Montpellier were beaten by Connacht in the opening game of the Champions Cup pool stages.

Honours
 Top 14
 Champions: 2022
 Runners-up (2): 2011, 2018
 Rugby Pro D2
 Champions: 2003
 European Rugby Challenge Cup
 Champions: 2016, 2021
 European Shield:
 Champions: 2004
 Challenge de l'Espérance:
 Champions: 1993

Finals results

Top 14

European Shield

European Challenge Cup

Current standings

Current squad

The Montpellier squad for the 2022–23 season is:

Espoirs squad

The Montpellier Hérault Rugby Espoirs squad is:

Notable former players

See also
 List of rugby union clubs in France
 Rugby union in France

References

External links
  Montpellier Hérault Rugby Club official website

 
French rugby union clubs
Rugby clubs established in 1986
Sport in Montpellier
1986 establishments in France